El bandolero is a 2015 Peruvian martial arts thriller film written, filmed, directed and co-starred by Dante Rubio Rodrigo.

Synopsis 
A man wants to put an end to the injustices and crime that are rampant in Chota. For this reason, he murders those who he judges to be criminals, in accordance with his absurd philosophy according to which one must kill so that others do not do so in the future.

Release 
It premiered on August 21, 2015, in Peruvian theaters. To then premiere on September 28, 2016, at the Clico de Cine Peruano de Primavera 2016, and in October of the same year at the 3rd Trujillo Film Festival 2016.

References 

2015 films
2015 martial arts films
2015 action thriller films
2015 independent films
Peruvian martial arts films
Peruvian thriller films
Peruvian action films
Peruvian crime films
2010s Spanish-language films
2010s Peruvian films
Films set in Peru
Films shot in Peru
Films about criminals